Mama Malone is an American sitcom that aired on CBS from March 7, 1984, to July 21, 1984, and featured Lila Kaye
in the title role.

Premise
The series' main character was Renate Malone (surname rhymed with "baloney"), an Italian-American woman married to an Irish-American man (never seen in the series), thus the unusual pronunciation of her married name. She was the hostess of a home cooking show called Cooking with Mama Malone that was telecast live from her fourth-floor apartment in a Brooklyn tenement. Each episode began with her instructing her viewers to chop onions no matter what the recipe might be, and the recipes never were completed because a parade of characters kept popping in to interrupt her and eat up the show's time.

Initially, the show was scheduled to premiere in the fall of 1982, but was pushed back a season and a half. The series was reminiscent of another ethnically-based series, The Goldbergs, the radio and TV show written by and starring Gertrude Berg as a New York City resident of European Jewish descent that played on ethno-religious neighborhoods populated by immigrant groups. Among the good-natured stereotypes on Mama Malaone was Padre Guradiano, an Italian-American Catholic priest who wound up gasping for breath each time he climbed the steep stairs to her apartment.

Cast
Lila Kaye as Renate Malone
Randee Heller as Connie Malone Karamkopoulos
Evan Richards as Frankie Karamkopoulos
Don Amendolia as Dino Forresti
Raymond Singer as Austin
Ralph Manza as Padre Guardiano
Sam Anderson as Stanley

US television ratings

Note: The rating presented here comes from the TV ratings guide website and may not be completely accurate.

Episodes

Reception
Mama Malone was poorly received critically and by audiences, owing to the characters drawing accusations of being stereotypical and Kaye, who was British, actually being miscast as an Italian-American.

The show had premiered in the spring of 1984, but it lasted for no longer than thirteen episodes, whose titles are given above, and was canceled in the summer of 1984 due to low ratings.

References

External links
 

1984 American television series debuts
1984 American television series endings
CBS original programming
English-language television shows
1980s American sitcoms
Television shows set in New York City
Television series by Sony Pictures Television